Déborah Weil (29 September 1957 – 6 November 2004) was a Mexican diver. She competed in the women's 10 metre platform event at the 1976 Summer Olympics.

References

External links
 

1957 births
2004 deaths
Mexican female divers
Olympic divers of Mexico
Divers at the 1976 Summer Olympics
Divers from Mexico City